GridLAB-D is an open-source (BSD license) simulation and analysis tool that models emerging smart grid energy technologies. It couples power flow calculations with distribution automation models, building energy use and appliance demand models, and market models.  It is used primarily to estimate the benefits and impacts of smart grid technology.

Research and development 

Funding for the research and development of GridLAB-D has come from multiple sources, including the United States Department of Energy (US DOE) and the California Energy Commission (CEC).

United States Department of Energy 

GridLAB-D was developed with funding from the US DOE Office of Electricity (OE) at Pacific Northwest National Laboratory (PNNL), in collaboration with industry and academia. It is available for Microsoft Windows, macOS and several Linux implementations and released through GitHub. 

Original work on GridLAB-D was started at PNNL in 2003 under a Laboratory Directed Research and Development project called PDSS. Starting in 2008 GridLAB-D was made available to the public under a BSD-style open-source license with a US Government right-to-use clause. US DOE has supported GridLAB-D through both direct funding and funding of projects that support enhancements to the simulation's capabilities.

California Energy Commission 

In 2017 the CEC awarded several grants to enhance GridLAB-D with the aim to support use in California regions operated by the investor-owned utility ratepayers. The enhancements focus on the California Public Utilities Commission's (CPUC) proceedings related to distributed and renewable energy resource integration, with particular attention to usability, scalability and interoperability. Hitachi America Laboratory (HAL) leads the GridLAB-D Open Workspace (GLOW) project to develop a user-interface for GridLAB-D.  SLAC National Accelerator Laboratory (SLAC) leads the High-Performance Agent-based Simulation (HiPAS) project to enhance the performance of GridLAB-D. HiPAS GridLAB-D is released through GitHub. SLAC also leads the Open Framework for Integrated Data Operations (OpenFIDO) to support  data exchange between GridLAB-D and other widely used power system data collection, modeling, and analytics tools.

See also
 Agent-based models
 Agent-based computational economics
 Open energy system models – listing a number of open source electricity and energy system modeling projects
 Smart grid

References

Notes

 
 
 
 
 
 
 
 
 
 
 
 
 
 
 
 
 
 
 
 
 
 Schneider, K.P., Fuller, J.C., Tuffner, F., Singh, R., Evaluation of Conservation Voltage Reduction on a National Level, Pacific Northwest National Laboratory report for the US Department of Energy, 2010
 Schneider, K.P., Fuller, J.C., Tuffner, F., Singh, R., and Chen, Y,  Evaluation of General Electric's Coordinated Volt VAR Control for American Electric Power, Pacific Northwest Laboratory report for American Electric Power, 2010.
 
 
 Fuller, J.C., Temperature Dependent Control of Community Energy Storage Devices, Washington State University Libraries in fulfillment for MSEE, 2010.
 Schneider, K.P., Fuller, J.C., Detailed Analysis of Distribution System Voltage Reduction, Proceedings of 2010 Distributech, 2010.

External links 

Free simulation software